Elections to Preston Municipal Borough council were held in late 1947.

Results

1947 English local elections
1947
1940s in Lancashire